The Report of the Select Committee on U.S. National Security and Military/Commercial Concerns with the People's Republic of China, commonly known as the Cox Report after Representative Christopher Cox, is a classified U.S. government document reporting on the People's Republic of China's covert operations within the United States during the 1980s and 1990s. The redacted version of the report was released to the public on May 25, 1999.

Committee created by the U.S. House of Representatives
The report was the work product of the Select Committee on U.S. National Security and Military/Commercial Concerns with the People's Republic of China. This special committee, created by a 409–10 vote of the U.S. House of Representatives on June 18, 1998, was tasked with the responsibility of investigating whether technology or information was transferred to the People's Republic of China that may have contributed to the enhancement of the nuclear-armed intercontinental ballistic missiles or to the manufacture of weapons of mass destruction.

A similar investigation had already begun in the U.S. Senate under the leadership of Senator Fred Thompson (Republican-Tennessee). Thompson had opened his hearings on China's influence in America's 1996 presidential and congressional elections 11 months earlier (on July 8, 1997).

The Chairman of the committee was Republican Rep. Christopher Cox of California, whose name became synonymous with the committee's final report. Four other Republicans and Democrats served on the panel, including Representative Norm Dicks, who served as the ranking Democratic member. The committee's final report was approved unanimously by all 9 members. The redacted version of the report was released to the public May 25, 1999.

Major allegations
The Cox Report contained five major allegations about China and nuclear weapons.
 China stole design information regarding the United States' seven most advanced thermonuclear weapons.
 These stolen secrets enabled the PLA to accelerate the design, development and testing of its own nuclear weapons.
 China's next generation of nuclear weapons would contain elements of stolen U.S. design information and would be comparable in effectiveness to the weapons used by the United States.
 Small warheads based on stolen U.S. information could be ready for deployment in 2002 also enabling China to integrate MIRV technology on its next generation of missiles.
 These thefts were not isolated incidents, but rather the results of decades of intelligence operations against U.S. weapons laboratories conducted by the Ministry of State Security. In addition, the report described the illegal activity likely persisted despite new security measures implemented as a result of the scandal.

While several groups, including the People's Republic of China, contend that the Report is overstated or inaccurate, its authors and supporters maintain that its gist is undeniable. The report's basic findings were as follows, quoted from the above document's opening summary:

Reactions

U.S. Government
The Cox Report's release prompted major legislative and administrative reforms.  More than two dozen of the Select Committee's recommendations were enacted into law, including the creation of a new National Nuclear Security Administration to take over the nuclear weapons security responsibilities of the United States Department of Energy.  At the same time, no person has ever been convicted of providing nuclear information to the PRC, and the one case that was brought in connection to these charges, that of Wen Ho Lee, fell apart.

In response to the allegations contained in the report, the CIA appointed retired U.S. Navy Admiral David E. Jeremiah to review and assess the report's findings. In April 1999, Admiral Jeremiah released a report backing up the Cox Report's main allegation that stolen information had been used to develop or modernize Chinese missiles and/or warheads.

PRC Government
The Chinese government called all allegations "groundless".

Academia
Richard L. Garwin remarked that stolen information regarding the W-70 and W-88 warhead would not appear to directly impair U.S. national security since to develop weapons based on this technology would require a massive investment in resources and not be in their best strategic interests with regard to their nuclear program.

An assessment report that was published by Stanford University's  Center for International Security and Cooperation said that the language of the Cox report "was inflammatory and some allegations did not seem to be well supported."

Related prosecutions
Two of the U.S. companies named in the report – Loral Space and Communications Corp. and Hughes Electronics Corp. – were later successfully prosecuted by the federal government for violations of U.S. export control law, resulting in the two largest fines in the history of the Arms Export Control Act.  Loral paid a $14 million fine in 2002, and Hughes paid a $32 million fine in 2003.

Timeline

June 1995, "Walk-in" agent gives CIA agents classified Chinese document detailing American nuclear designs.
July 1995, CIA director, Energy Secretary, and chief of staff learn of nuclear espionage for first time.
October 31, 1995, FBI agents learn of nuclear thefts.
November 1995, National Security Advisor to the President learns of Chinese nuclear espionage.
Late 1995, Energy Dept. agents discover theft of nuclear designs while analyzing nuclear tests by China.
April 1996, Assist. National Security Advisor, Defense Sec., Attorney General, FBI director learn of nuclear thefts.
July 1997, President learns of Chinese nuclear espionage from National Security Advisor.
December 1999, four Stanford University professors release a report rebutting the Cox Commission, noting that "...facts are wrong and a number of conclusions are, in our view, unwarranted."

See also
 Chinese espionage in the United States

References

Classified documents
Intelligence reports
Reports of the United States government
China–United States relations
Nuclear program of the People's Republic of China
1999 documents